Shigeno may refer to:

Shigeno Station, railway station of Shinano Railway Line in Tōmi City, Nagano Prefecture, Japan
12788 Shigeno, a main-belt asteroid
Battle of Shigeno, fought in the final months of 1614, was one element in the siege of Osaka

People with the surname
Shuichi Shigeno (born 1958), Japanese manga author famous for the anime and manga Initial D
Yasumasa Shigeno, Japanese politician and member of the House of Representatives for the Social Democratic Party

Japanese-language surnames